Willem Van Schuerbeeck (born 24 October 1984) is a Belgian long-distance runner. He competed in the marathon at the 2016 Summer Olympics on 21 August 2016 finishing 56th in 2:18:56.

Biography
Willem Van Schuerbeeck was born in 1984 and has two sisters and a brother. He lives in Merchtem and is married and father of a son and daughter. He works as a teacher in physical education in Brussels.

Olympic qualification
With a personal best of 2 hours 12 minutes and 49 seconds (achieved at the 2015 Berlin Marathon), Van Schuerbeeck was the second-fastest Belgian runner to meet the requirements for qualification of the Belgian Olympic Committee.

Notes

External links
Willem Van Schuerbeeck profile at IAAF
Personal webpage

1984 births
Living people
Belgian male marathon runners
Olympic athletes of Belgium
Athletes (track and field) at the 2016 Summer Olympics
People from Merchtem
Sportspeople from Flemish Brabant